Tanzania first participated at the Olympic Games in 1964, and has sent athletes to compete in every Summer Olympic Games except for the boycotted 1976 Games and has never participated in the Winter Olympic Games.

Tanzanian athletes have won a total of two medals, both in athletics.

The National Olympic Committee for Tanzania was created in 1968 and recognized by the International Olympic Committee that same year.

The résumé of Olympic events in which Tanzania has officially participated has been a static entity for most of the country's Olympic career, at least until recently. The country has in recent years began to diversify the body of its participating athletes. Tanzania introduced itself to the Olympic swimming community at the 2008 Summer Olympics at Beijing, with its first team, which included the nation's first female athlete competing in a sport outside the country's familiar realm of athletics. Tanzania also included female swimming its team sent to the 2012 Summer Olympics in London. Despite the diversification of the nation's Olympic participation, the athlete body of the country's Olympic team nevertheless remains small.

Medal tables

Medals by Summer Games

Medals by sport

List of medalists

See also
 List of flag bearers for Tanzania at the Olympics

External links
 
 
 

 
Olympics